On 19 April 1979, approximately 100 students were massacred in Ngaragba Prison, in Bangui, Central African Republic, following student protests against president Jean-Bédel Bokassa.

Background 
Described as one of Africa's most brutal dictators, Bokassa came to power after a coup in 1965 and ruled as an authoritarian leader. Under Bokassa, many political opponents were tortured and killed.

New uniforms 
In January 1979, Bokassa tried to force all students in the Central African Republic, from elementary school to university students, to wear uniforms made by a company owned by one of his wives. In response to this, students began protesting against Bokassa and by April 1979, the students and police "were practically in state of war". Many students were shot dead by the police during these protests.

Mass arrests of students 
In mid-April 1979, a group of plainclothes police officers attempted to infiltrate a student's meeting. Upon discovering the police officers, the students stripped them naked and pushed them into the street. It has been suggested that this incident triggered the mass arrests of students who were suspected of participating in the protests.

On 19 April 1979, at least 100 students were arrested and taken to  Ngaragba Prison. In prison, the students were beaten by the guards and forced into overcrowded cells.

Massacre 
At 10pm on 19 April 1979, Bokassa visited the students in their cells and warned that he would 'teach them a lesson'. He beat several young boys to death using his ivory‐encrusted ebony cane. He ordered the prison guards to 'carry on'. At least 100 students were beaten to death by Bokassa and the prison guards. Several students survived by pretending to be dead.

Aftermath 
After the massacre, Bokassa was condemned by foreign governments and international organizations cut off aid. On On September 20, 1979, French special forces overthrew Bokassa in a military coup, ending his 13-year rule.

References   

1979 in Africa
Prison massacres
Student massacres
Massacres in 1979
Massacres in Africa